Jackson Prairie Underground Natural Gas Storage Facility is a natural gas storage facility in Southwest Washington, owned by Puget Sound Energy, Avista and Williams Companies's Northwest Pipeline GP. With 25 billion cubic feet working capacity (47 billion cubic feet total capacity), it is the largest natural gas-storage reservoir in the Pacific Northwest and the 14th largest in the United States.

Geology
The gas storage is in an aquifer contained by the sandstone Skookumchuck formation, about 1,000 to 3,000 feet underground.

Development
The well turned out to be a dry hole and repurposed for gas storage. In 1964 the first gas was injected. As of 2016, there were a total of 104 wells, 55 being used for gas injection or extraction.

References

Further reading

External links
 (Puget Sound Energy)
Chapter 80.40 RCW –UNDERGROUND NATURAL GAS STORAGE ACT (1963)
 

1964 establishments in Washington (state)
Buildings and structures in Lewis County, Washington
Energy infrastructure completed in 1964
Energy infrastructure in Washington (state)
Puget Sound Energy